Peter Ortiz Gustafson (May 9, 1934 in San Juan, Puerto Rico – August 18, 2016 in San Juan, Puerto Rico) was an associate justice of the Supreme Court of Puerto Rico.  Appointed by Puerto Rico Governor Rafael Hernandez Colon in 1985, he served on the court until 1990. Prior to his appointment, he had been a Superior Court judge for many years.

After his resignation, he was succeeded as associate justice by José Andreu García, who in 1992 went on to become Chief Justice.  His last reported public statement was in 2009 when he opposed the Puerto Rico Supreme Court's request to the Legislature to increase its membership from 7 to 9.

Sources 
La Justicia en sus Manos, Luis Rafael Rivera,

References

Associate Justices of the Supreme Court of Puerto Rico
Puerto Rican lawyers
Puerto Rican judges
1934 births
2016 deaths
20th-century American judges